The Agnes River is a river in the Lake Huron drainage basin in Unorganized Sudbury District in Northeastern Ontario, Canada.

The river begins at an Sinaminda Lake and flows southeast to its mouth at the Spanish River, which flows to the North Channel on Lake Huron. The outflow from Sinaminda Lake is controlled by the Sinaminda Dam, owned by Domtar; water from the lake reservoir is used to provide a regulated flow to hydroelectric generating stations owned by Vale Inco further downstream on the Spanish River. The mouth of river is a glacially-formed fluvial delta.

A stand of old-growth forest called the Agnes River Old Pine is located in the Agnes River drainage basin.

Tributaries
Shakwa River (right)

See also
List of rivers of Ontario

References

 Shows the river course.

Rivers of Sudbury District